This is a list of schools in Miyun District, Beijing.

Secondary schools
Note: In China the word 中学 zhōngxué, literally translated as "middle school", refers to any secondary school and differs from the American usage of the term "middle school" to mean specifically a lower secondary school or junior high school. 初中 chū​zhōng is used to refer to a lower secondary school.

 Beijing City Miyun District Dachengzi School (北京市密云区大城子学校)
 Beijing City Miyun District Gaoling School (北京市密云区高岭学校)
 Beijing City Miyun District No. 2 High School (北京市密云区第二中学)
 Beijing City Miyun District No. 3 High School (北京市密云区第三中学)
 Beijing City Miyun District No. 5 High School (北京市密云区第五中学)
 Beijing City Miyun District No. 6 High School (北京市密云区第六中学)
 Beijing City Miyun District Beizhuang High School (北京市密云区北庄中学)
 Beijing City Miyun District Bulaotun High School (北京市密云区不老屯中学)
 Beijing City Miyun District Dongshaoqu High School (北京市密云区东邵渠中学)
 Beijing City Miyun District Gubeikou High School (北京市密云区古北口中学)
 Beijing City Miyun District Henanzhai High School  (北京市密云区河南寨中学)
 Beijing City Miyun District Jugezhuang High School (北京市密云区巨各庄中学)
 Beijing City Miyun District Mujiayu High School  (北京市密云区穆家峪中学)
 Beijing City Miyun District Shilibao High School (北京市密云区十里堡中学)
 Beijing City Miyun District Taishizhuang High School (北京市密云区太师庄中学)
 Beijing City Miyun District Xinchengzi High School (北京市密云区新城子中学)
 Beijing City Miyun District Xinnongcun High School (北京市密云区新农村中学)
 Beijing City Miyun District Xitiangezhuang High School (北京市密云区西田各庄中学)
 Beijing City Miyun District Vocational School (北京市密云区职业学校)
 Beijing City Miyun District Special Education School (北京市密云区特殊教育学校)
 Beijing City Miyun Reservoir High School (北京市密云水库中学)
 Beijing Normal University Miyun Experimental High School (北京师范大学密云实验中学)
 Beijing Yuying School (北京市育英学校) - Miyun Branch School (密云分校)
 Capital Normal University Affiliated Miyun High School (首都师范大学附属密云中学)
  (北方交通大学附属中学) - Miyun School (密云分校)

Primary schools

References

Miyun
Schools